Pinoy Big Brother: Double Up is the third main season of the Philippine ABS-CBN reality television series Pinoy Big Brother and the seventh season overall, which began on October 4, 2009, on ABS-CBN. Toni Gonzaga, Mariel Rodriguez, and Bianca Gonzalez reprised their hosting duties this season, replacing Sineserye Presents: The Susan Roces Cinema Collection: Florinda. It ran for 133 days until February 13, 2010, which broke Season 2's record for the longest stay of housemates inside the house by only one week.

There were two sets of auditions for this season. The first set was held in late 2007 at several cities in the Philippines, as well as the cities of Madrid, Milan, and Dubai. Those auditions also produced the housemates for Pinoy Big Brother: Teen Edition Plus. A second series of auditions, which included selections for the third Teen Edition, were held in several key cities in the Philippines and the cities of Tokyo and San Francisco. An estimated 57,824 people attended the auditions. From those two auditions, only 50 people were reportedly chosen for the shortlist. A total of 26 housemates entered the House, with 14 on Day 1 and ten on Day 7. The last two housemates entered on Day 43.

The winner of the new season received an LCD TV set, an Asian tour package, a business package, a house and lot, and PHP 1 million in cash. The winner also donated another PHP 1 million to a charity of their choice, making Double Up the first non-celebrity season to do so.

This season also marked the return of Pinoy Big Brother UpLate, after being replaced by Pinoy Big Brother Über in the second Celebrity Edition and Pinoy Big Brother: Teen Edition Plus. Mariel continued hosting Über while Bianca took the helm for UpLate. Episodes from the previous week were also recapped through a weekend program on Studio 23 entitled Pinoy Big Brother: Primetime Weekends on 23 and delayed, but unedited late morning/early afternoon feed through Pinoy Big Brother: Raw on Studio 23.

Melisa Cantiveros emerged as the winner of this season.

Overview

House theme

With the Double-up twist of having two houses, the houses have a European motif for interiors with bright colors as inspired by architectural designs of Antoni Gaudí for House A and Vincent Van Gogh's paintings for House B. The houses appear to be smaller than before, with each house having the same set of amenities with different wall paintings. House A has predominantly blue and green wall paintings. House B has predominantly red and yellow wall paintings. Furthermore, House A's garden inherits the infinity pool previously seen in Teen Edition: Plus and the second season of Pinoy Dream Academy; House B only has a simple terrace area with a jacuzzi at one side.

Double Up Twists
Aside from having two Houses, the season was dubbed Double-Up for several reasons.
Double-Up Housemates - Two sets of identical twins were included in the roster of housemates - with each member of the twins living in both parts of the house, switching between the two areas when instructed. However, the rest of the housemates do not know about the twins, or the fact that there are two houses. The twins will also receive immunity from nomination for eviction during the first nomination night if they succeed in keeping this a secret, but if they do reveal it they will be forcibly evicted.
House Swaps - Housemates are made to swap houses and group members as instructed by Big Brother.
Bagyong Walay - Big Brother instructed female housemates from Houses A and B to swap houses. 
Big Brother Swap - Carrying on from the second regular season, a Filipino housemate would temporarily trade places with a housemate from another active Big Brother season abroad (see below).
Bagyong Isa - Housemates from both houses will be staying in one house. 14 housemates should survive Vote To Evict in order for them to stay in one house. 
Vote To Evict - The public is given the power to vote to evict a housemate. The housemate with the highest votes will be evicted at the end of the week. 
SE Voting System - The public votes to save or evict a housemate. Housemate with the lowest net votes, save and evict votes combined, is evicted.
Head of Household and Hand Grenade - The Head of Household twist is once again used with the Hand Grenade as the new addition. Both were implemented after the housemates began living in one house. The Hand Grenade goes to the ultimate loser in the HOH competition. See Head of Household and Hand Grenade sections for further details.
Char-Char Change - Big Brother made a fake announcement that public voting is discontinued and the housemates themselves will vote among the nominees for who should be evicted, but the ultimate fate will still be decided by the public. Big Brother used this system to show each housemate's true feelings toward their fellow housemates. The name of the twist is a play on Charter change and "Char-Char," which is Filipino slang for "false."
 House Players - Evicted or Former housemate/s will return to the house to test the remaining official housemates through tasks set by Big Brother and the audience.
The Big Jump to the Big Night - The seven remaining housemates will undergo a series of challenges. The overall winner will be granted permanent immunity from nominations and automatic inclusion into the Big Night.
The White Room - Two of the six remaining housemates would undergo an endurance challenge in a purely white room for a chance to win a brand-new house and lot. A housemate would lose the challenge if he or she pressed a red button somewhere in the room.
Big Five - Big Brother decided to put five housemates in contention for the Big Winner title instead of the standard four; the "Fifth Big Placer" would get PHP100,000 as his prize and the same amount for his chosen charity.
Big Reveal - For the first time in the franchise's history, the actual ranking of the finalists were revealed to the public before the Big Night. This happened on Day 129.

Housemates
There were a total of twenty-six housemates - twenty official housemates, four sub-official housemates, and two replacement housemates, who entered the Houses: the first set of 14 housemates entered on Day 1 (October 4, 2009), while a second set of 10 were introduced on Day 7 (October 10, 2009). A third batch of two housemates entered the house on Day 43 (November 15, 2009). They are divided below by the batch from which they were introduced and House in which they live. The ages indicated were the housemates' ages upon their entrance to the house. The twins are marked with different colors. A table is included to show the housemates shifted houses in the duration of the show.

The first batch of housemates entered the Houses on Day 1 (October 4, 2009) in the order shown. They appeared and disappeared from stage with the use of several magic tricks, with a Magic-themed kick-off. Filipino-American artist Amber Davis sang the theme song, with ex-housemates Jason Gainza, Cassandra Ponti and Franzen Fajardo from Season 1, Niña Jose from Teen Edition 1, and Wendy Valdez and Gee-Ann Abrahan from Season 2.

The second batch of Housemates entered the Big Brother House on Day 7 (October 10, 2009), during another special show called "The Spooktacular Reveal," utilizing a haunted house theme. Housemates were escorted by hosts Bianca and Mariel to the front door of the house. While the 10 housemates in the two houses danced to the tune of Thriller, outside the house, present were Big Winners and ex-housemates Nene Tamayo from Season 1, John Prats from Celebrity Edition 1, Beatriz Saw and Mickey Perz from Season 2, Robi Domingo from Teen Edition Plus, and the recently evicted Double-up housemates Kenny and Toffi Santos and JM Lagumbay.

On Day 41 (November 13, 2009), right after Big Brother announced Tom's forced eviction to the housemates, primetime edition host Toni Gonzaga revealed that new housemate(s) - confirmed during the following night's broadcast as a guy and a girl - would enter the house. The new housemates entered on Day 43 (November 15, 2009).

House stay history

Big Brother Swap

It was announced by the program on Day 21 (October 24, 2009) that another Big Brother Swap would take place. This time, one from either House would trade places with another housemate from another foreign edition of Big Brother. This would also be the second time that Pinoy Big Brother linked up with other foreign versions of the show, Season 2 being the first, when housemate Bruce Quebral traded places with Tina Semolič from the first season of Big Brother Slovenia.

On Day 26, it was announced by the host that the show would be swapping housemates with Big Brother Finland's fifth season. On October 29, 2009, ABS-CBN's YouTube channel, iABS-CBN, uploaded a video confirming that the housemate from Big Brother Finland who will swap places in the Philippines is Kätlin Laas (video), a 22-year-old food processing plant worker originally from Rakvere, Estonia but migrated to Finland at the age of 16, and is currently living in Seinäjoki, Finland. On Day 27, it was announced that Cathy from Group A, then currently living in House B, would be swapping with Kätlin and would be going to Finland to live in their Big Brother House for a week. Cathy's selection was made through a series of tasks on which the housemates underwent on the watchful eyes of the Finnish producers.

Kätlin left the Big Brother Finland House on Day 26 (Day 66 of the Finnish version) and enter either Philippine House on Day 29 (Day 69 of the Finnish version). She was supposed to arrive in the Philippines and enter either House the day before, but her flight was delayed due to weather disturbances caused by Typhoon Santi. Hours before her entrance, she had a brief appearance on the show The Buzz. On the other hand, Cathy was supposed to leave in the morning of Day 28 (Day 68 of the Finnish version) but their flight was postponed to a later hour of the day.

Much like the first Big Swap, events from both Houses are chronicled. Also, all conversations in English are subtitled in Filipino and all Finnish conversations and confessions are dubbed over by Filipino voice actors. For the Finnish version, clips from the Philippine house are shown in the Big Brother Extra show, while conversations in English are subtitled in Suomi.

The Big Swap started on the evening of Day 29 (Day 69 of the Finnish version). Kätlin initially stayed in House A upon her arrival on Day 29. She transferred to House B on Day 31. On Day 32, Cathy and Kätlin were finally able to meet through a video call through Skype. Later that day, Kätlin returned to House A. She left the Philippine House on the morning of Day 34 (early morning of Day 74 of the Finnish version). She was briefly interviewed for the morning show Umagang Kay Ganda just after stepping outside the front door. Meanwhile, Cathy entered on the evening of Day 69 of the Finnish version (early morning of Day 30 of the Philippines version). She left six days later on the evening of Day 74 of the Finnish version (early morning of Day 35 of the Philippine version), signaling the end of the Big Swap.

Kätlin left the Philippines the same day she left the Pinoy Big Brother house and re-entered their house in the early morning of Day 75 of the Finnish version (Day 35 of the Philippine version). Cathy left Finland the morning after she left the Finnish Big Brother house and re-entered the Pinoy Big Brother house on the evening of Day 36 (Day 76 of the Finnish version).

Below is a list of activities each swapped housemate did in their respective host country's Houses, aside from introductions and trading of basic phrases:

Also, both Philippine and Finnish houses had weekly tasks involving housemates doing a 30-minute cultural variety show portraying their countries' cultures to their visitors. The Filipino housemates should include Kätlin in their presentation while the Finnish housemates should work four at a time in the upstairs room while Cathy is not around. However, it was later revealed that the real weekly task of the Filipino housemates is to make Kätlin feel the Filipino hospitality, to which she felt that both houses were friendly, yet she felt more warmth with House A.

More than three weeks after the Swap ended, on Day 97 of the fifth Finnish season, Kätlin was proclaimed as second placer, behind Aso.

The Three Kings
On Day 71 (December 13, 2009), Big Brother designated Hermes, Johan, and Patrick as the three kings, which were tasked to designate the ten stars containing gifts to the ten other housemates in the house.
1st Gift: Aral ng Pagpapakumbaba (Lesson In Humility) (Day 71) - the housemate had to live, sleep and eat in a kariton, a wooden pushcart for three days (given to Paul Jake)
2nd Gift: Aral sa Pagtitipid ng Damit (Lesson on Frugality in Clothing) (Day 71) - the housemate had to wear a bahag, the native clothing of the Ifugao, for three days (given to Tibo)
3rd Gift: Date with a Celebrity (Day 72) - the housemate had to act like a refined Filipino, in exchange for a date with a favorite celebrity (given to Melisa)
4th Gift: Aral ng Pagtitipid sa Pagkain (Lesson on Frugality in Food) (Day 73) - the housemate will have to eat nothing but sweet potatoes for three days (given to Rica)
5th Gift: Washing Machine (Day 73) - the housemate had to wash the other housemates' clothes while they are still wearing them, in exchange for a washing machine and dryer (given to Carol)
6th Gift: Digicam (Day 74) - given to a housemate who likes to pose in front of the cameras inside the house. The recipient must teach a certain housemate (Carol) how to walk like a fashion model. (given to Cathy)
7th Gift: Aral sa Pagtitipid ng Tubig (Lesson on Frugality in Water) (Day 75) - the housemate has to keep herself from taking a bath (in the bathroom or in the swimming pool) (given to Sam)
8th Gift: Malaman ang Katotohanan (To Know the Truth) (Day 76) - each of the three kings will give one nomination point to a common housemate and directly explain their reasons. (given to Kath)
9th Gift: Tricycle (Day 86) - the housemate will become a house servant for four days, where he needs to do all the chores of the house and must obey everything the other housemates tell him to do. The housemate will also be the first to wake up and the last to sleep. These sacrifices will be in exchange for a tricycle. For every mistake the housemate makes, a part of the tricycle will be removed. (given to Jason)
10th Gift: Laptop (Day 93) - the housemate would become a teacher to Dengue and two other "mischievous classmates" (namely Clownie and Chacky) which are actually dolls for three days. (given to Mariel)

Ex-Housemate Entries

German ex-housemate visit
On Day 76 (December 18, 2009), the program announced that an ex-housemate from a European Big Brother franchise will visit the Pinoy Big Brother house for the holidays, which they dubbed as Super G (known for having G-cup-sized breasts). On Day 78 (December 20, 2009), it was revealed that Annina Ucatis from the ninth season of Big Brother Germany will be the visitor, which aims to spice up the housemates' Christmas. Due to weather problems, Annina's scheduled entry on Day 79 (December 21, 2009) was postponed. She left Germany in the evening of Day 79. Annina entered the house in the evening of Day 80, in a giant gift box, during Paul Jake's birthday.

On Day 84, before the eviction, Sascha, an ex-housemate from the same season as Annina's and also Annina's current boyfriend, entered the house to fetch Annina.

While she was in the Pinoy Big Brother House, Annina did the following tasks:

Resbak Attack twist
On Day 105 (January 16, 2010), after Cathy's eviction, the show announced a new twist involving ex-housemates re-entering House B to compete with the remaining housemates. Cathy, the latest evictee, was instructed by Big Brother to move to House B instead of formally exiting the Pinoy Big Brother House. Princess, Delio, Tom, Rob, Yuri, Patrick and Rica joined Cathy at House B. Tom later voluntary exited and was replaced by Kenny. These eight ex-housemates competed with the remaining eight housemates with the pot money of the Big Four at stake. From the name itself, the ex-housemates had the task of seeking revenge on the remaining eight housemates.

Kuya's Darlings
As an added twist, on Day 112, when Cathy, Delio, Kenny, Patrick and Rob were given their honorable dismissal from their Resbak Attack duties, Princess, Rica and Yuri were recommissioned by Big Brother to take part in another twist. The three housemates will serve as House Players. For each task they accomplished, each one will be getting PHP 5,000, plus a laptop computer for the final task. The tasks will either be voted upon by the public or ordered by Big Brother. The three ex-housemates were to act returning housemates in exchange for the three eggs broken the week before. Below are the tasks decided upon by viewers:

Weekly tasks
Both houses do the same weekly task. By the end of the week, Big Brother assesses each house. Assessment would depend whether the task is a competition between two houses or each house would be assessed on its own. If the task is a competition, the winning house gets their allowance for the upcoming week while the losing house gets no money.

Group A housemates are housemates initially from House A while Group B housemates are housemates initially from House B, with the exception of Tom, originally part of House A, and Melisa, originally part of House B, who were swapped by Big Brother before the end of the first weekly task. For the fourth weekly task, the housemates swapped houses, and Rob and Carol swapped groups.

For the sixth weekly task, aside from the weekly budget, the winning house only had the housemate/s with the highest point as its nominee/s for the following week while the losing house had the housemates with the top three different points as its nominees. As a reward in the fourth and last challenge, the Group A got their clothes and the house of their choice.

For the seventh weekly task, aside from the weekly budget, the winning house will only have the housemate/s with the highest point as its nominee/s and also be able to give one housemate from the losing house an automatic nomination. As winners, Group B got their clothes.

Before the eighth weekly task started, the females of each group swap houses. Males from Group A and females from Group B were to be known as "Neo-Group A" while females from Group A and males from Group B were to be known as "Neo-Group B".

 : With Patrick's sacrifice of standing straight on a cart for 12 hours, House B got 50% of their weekly budget.
 : Originally, all male housemates with the exception of Jason who will be wearing a flesh-colored bodysuit, will be dancing naked while all female housemates will wear a T-back bikini. However, due to some housemates' families' reaction about the task, House A housemates Tibo (in exchange for groceries for his family with the same amount as their weekly budget) and Johan decided to wear a flesh-colored bodysuit and T-back bikini, respectively, while all House B housemates decided to wear flesh-colored bodysuits. House A scored 185 points, down from their 350 base points after committing 18 mistakes. House B scored -1130 points, down from their 100 base points after committing 82 mistakes.
 : Upon her arrival at the Confession Room, Kätlin Laas chose Group B's artwork which signaled their win. Both artworks were actually half-finished.
 : Group B housemates, performing first, had a variety show which included Patria explaining the Philippine Flag, a series of dances including Paro-Parong Bukid danced by Rob and Yuri, Tinikling danced by Mariel and Tom, and the boys dancing Maglalatik, a role-playing on Filipino family and courtship and Tom and Kätlin singing Maalaala Mo Kaya. Group A housemates had a Wowowee type of show including dancing the Pandanggo sa Ilaw with Kätlin, dancing the Maglalatik, playing Filipino games, acting out certain Filipino television advertisements and soap operas, role-playing on Filipino courtship, dancing Singkil and Balagtasan (old Filipino form of a poetic debate) with Delio.
 : Only four challenges were held because Group A swept the first three challenges. The fourth challenge, deemed a special reward challenge, was also won by Group A. Thus, a fifth game was not necessary.
 : Neo-Group A's video, which had an anti-vice advocacy theme, earned 47,862 views against the 121,182 views of Neo-Group B's video, a midget skit entitled Pinoy Big Babies Toddlers Up.
 : Ram Ong, winner of TGIF’s bartending competition this year and the official representative of the Philippines to the Asia-Pacific region to the World Bartender Championship in 2010, and Ruel Santos, 2nd runner-up of TGIF's 14th Annual Shake Rattle and Pour, were the guest coaches who taught the housemates how to do flair bartending.
 : The housemates had to teach Annina all four tasks to get a budget the following week.
 : With Rica as the host, the concert sported a tiger motif with outfits designed by Sam. In sequence, the housemates performed a Pinoy Ako dance, the Punjabi tiger dance with Harish, a Patron Tequila dance performed by the girl housemates, a rock number performed by Cathy and Johan to the song You Belong With Me, a Hanggang Ngayon duet between Melisa and Jason, and a dance number played to the tune of the Survivor song Eye of the Tiger. The team made 14 mistakes.
 : The sipa task went underway on Day 93, but the housemates' initial excitement at winning the task was dashed as they reviewed the footage and saw that Kath did not count properly. The housemates decided to risk staying up longer hours to complete the task. The clock still had less than 500 minutes left at the time the task was finished.
 : The counting for yellow and green balls was correct but the count for blue balls was one short.
 : The domino tower remained intact despite being destroyed a few times. PHP 60,000 was deducted from the pot as three eggs were broken at PHP 20,000 each. The housemates lost twice in the games, costing PHP 45,000 each. A total of PHP 150,000 was deducted from the Big Four pot.

Head of Household and Hand Grenade
As the two houses became one, on Day 68, Big Brother revealed to the housemates two new twists this season, the Head of Household and Hand Grenade twists. The Head of Household twist is similar to the twist of the second season of Pinoy Big Brother: Celebrity Edition. Each week, the housemates will undergo HOH competitions. The HOH for the week will get the following privileges for winning:
 Immunity from nominations
 Use of shower room at any time
 Being able to receive items from the outside world that they desire
 Sending a text message to anyone at the outside world

A housemate will be chosen each week to become a hand grenade user, where they will be forced to give the full three points for nominations face-to-face to another housemate, as a consequence of losing in the HOH competition. Beginning the third HOH game, the hand grenade holder is given the alternative to automatically nominate themselves for eviction instead of giving all three points to another housemate.

For their final HOH competition in Day 111, Big Brother revealed that the final Head of Household will also be the Hand Grenade user, where the HOH will give an automatic nomination to one housemate.

Nomination history

The housemate first mentioned in each nomination gets two points, while the second gets one point. The percentage of votes shown is the percentage of votes to save unless other wise stated.

At least two housemates from each house will be up for eviction. This means that there are at least four housemates nominated every nomination night. However, the  housemate with lowest number of votes, no matter which house s/he is in, would be eliminated. Group A housemates are housemates initially from House A while Group B housemates are housemates initially from House B, with the exception of Tom, originally part of House A, and Melisa, originally part of House B, who were swapped by Big Brother before the first nomination. The color for the names of the votes and nominees indicate the group to which they each belong at the time of nomination and subsequent salvation from eviction.

On Day 23, the housemates switched houses, with Group A living in House B and vice versa. On Day 24, Rob and Carol swapped Groups and Houses, and are now therefore part of Groups B and A respectively. The color for groups did not change however.

On Day 39, as a result of the 4th game in the 6th weekly task, Group A and Group B housemates swapped houses once again. The color for groups did not change however.

On Day 50, the females of each group switched Houses. Group A's males and Group B's females were to be called "Neo-Group A," while Group A's females and Group B's males were to be known as "Neo-Group B." Both of the new-groups were therefore given new colors below; the colors for the Houses stay the same.

On Day 57, Big Brother announced that all housemates are up for eviction, with the viewers voting to evict.

On Day 63, Big Brother announced that the remaining housemates would be living in House A. Carol, Hermes, Melisa, Rica and Yuri were told to stay in House B to await the announcement of the evictee the following day. On Day 64, the fourteen remaining housemates all stayed in House A.

From the eighth nomination night onwards, a new voting scheme was used, wherein the viewers are given the choice of voting to save or voting to evict a housemate. The percentage of evict votes will be added from the percentage of save votes, the voting difference being used as basis. The housemate who gets the lowest difference is evicted from the house. Also, with the housemates already living in one house, the housemates with the three highest points will be nominated for eviction.

On Day 68, Big Brother announced that there will be Head of Household (HOH) competitions each week. The HOH gets immunity from nominations in their respective week. The hand grenade user gets to give the full three points to one housemate face to face. For the eighth and ninth nomination night, this is done before the other housemates nominated. From the tenth nomination night onwards, this is done after the other housemates nominated. Starting from the tenth nomination night onwards, the hand grenade user can also opt to give himself an Automatic Nomination instead of giving the three points to another housemate.

On Day 105, eight ex-housemates returned to take part in a twist by Big Brother. These housemates remained as ex-housemates and were not re-instilled as regular housemates. Five of the eight ex-housemates were given their repeated eviction on Day 112. The remaining three ex-housemates stayed for one more week and were given their repeated eviction on Day 119. Their first eviction status was maintained, however.

On Day 120, the six remaining housemates had a different manner of nominations, giving one point to two housemates they feel should leave face-to-face. However, Big Brother announced that all six housemates, including Melisa who has a sure spot in the Big 5, are up for eviction this week.

Legend
Bold Italicized name Indicates that the housemate won the "Big Jump to the Big Night"; however was still included in the list of remaining housemates, who will face the public vote, which is for the Big Winner.
 indicate nominees from Group A
 indicate nominees from Group B
 indicate nominees from Neo-Group A
 indicate nominees from Neo-Group B

 Automatic Nomination (due to violation(s) committed, as a reward for the winning house, as imposed by the Hand Grenade User)

: JP voluntarily left the House on Day 3. He last stayed in House B before he exited. JM, Kenny and Toffi failed their task and had to leave on Day 5.
: Princess, Mariel and Yhel were given an automatic nomination by Big Brother for talking about nominations with their fellow housemates. House B was given the opportunity to do a sacrifice to save one of the automatically nominated housemates, which they chose to be Mariel. Princess voluntarily left the House on Day 22. On Day 24, Rob and Carol were swapped to opposing groups. On Day 25, the voting for the Second Eviction Night was canceled due to Yhel's forced eviction, dubbed as the first forced eviction for the season.
: There were three nominees from Group B as there was a tie for the highest points scored. Both Tom and Mariel scored 5 points while Patrick scored 4 points, making him the third nominee, with the second highest nomination points.
: As Cathy was still en route from Finland to the Philippines, she was not able to nominate, although she could be nominated. Meanwhile, Tibo and Paul were each tied for the most nomination points with 5, while Jason and Carol were tied for the second most points with 3. On Day 39, voting was suspended due to Tom's exit from the house to be confined to the hospital. On Day 40, Tom was able to return, although voting remained suspended. On Day 41, it was announced that Tom has been forcibly evicted from the house. He left the next day accompanied by ex-housemate Princess.
: As per stipulation for the weekly task, only the top nomination point earner from Group A and the top three point earners from Group B were nominated. Tom, who was physically at House B during the nominations did not participate as he was already regarded as evicted.
: As per stipulation for the weekly task, only the top nomination point earner from Group B and the top two point earners from Group A were nominated. In addition to that, Group B automatically nominated Rica as part of their reward. As Rob and Patrick had the same highest number of nomination points, they were both nominated. As new housemates, Rocky and Sam were exempted from nominations. They were given the chance to nominate but their votes were not counted.
: Neo-Group A housemates nominated Neo-Group B housemates and vice versa. One point was given to each nominees instead of the usual 1 and 2 points. Big Brother then revealed the top two nominees, regardless of ties, to the housemates of each house. They were given the chance to discuss whether they would change their nominees or not. The top two nominees for Neo-Group A were Johan and Yuri. However, after the discussion of Neo-Group B, Kath was placed as a nominee instead of Yuri. The top two nominees for Neo-Group B were Rica and Rocky; no change in nominees happened after Neo-Group A's discussion. However, Big Brother later on announced that all housemates are up for eviction. On Day 63, voting was officially closed and all saved housemates were asked to stay in House A with the exception of Carol, Hermes, Melisa, Rica and Yuri who were asked to stay in House B until the next day.
: On Day 67, Rocky voluntarily exited the house.
: As the designated three kings, Hermes, Johan and Patrick had to give 3 points for nomination to one housemate, 1 point from each of them.
: As the hand grenade user, Jason opted to give himself an Automatic Nomination than to give the three points to another housemate.
: After Cathy has been evicted, she was not welcomed to the outside world and proceeded to House B after being instructed by Big Brother.
:  As part of the Resbak Attack twist, seven ex-housemates re-entered the house to challenge the remaining housemates. Princess, Delio, Tom, Rob, Yuri, Patrick and Rica re-entered House B where Cathy was already staying. Hermes chose to give himself an Automatic Nomination than to give the three points to another housemate. As Tom left on Day 107, Kenny re-entered the house to be his replacement. On Eviction Night, Cathy was given her exit, along with Delio, Kenny, Patrick and Rob.
:  Princess, Rica and Yuri were told to enter the main house as houseplayers. They were to pretend to be regular housemates. Big Brother revealed that the last HOH of the season (Tibo) will also serve as the Hand Grenade User, where he will have the power of automatic nomination. On Eviction Night, houseplayers Princess, Rica and Yuri were given their exit. This will be the last time that the S.E. voting scheme will be used in the season, for the public will already vote for the Big Winner.
:  As Melisa won the endurance challenge, she won an automatic spot in the Big Five and will be exempted from the last eviction until the final. Big Brother announced that this round of nominations were void, and all housemates are nominated for open voting to save. With this, Melisa was still nominated and should Melisa be the housemate that would have the lowest number of votes, she would still be saved in the upcoming eviction as per stipulation of the "Big Jump" special challenge. The second lowest would be evicted instead.
:  In the final week, all housemates remaining in the House are automatically up for public vote. The housemate with the largest percentage of votes will be the winner. The rest of the housemates would leave the House one by one according to percentage order, with the least leaving first. On Day 129, the ranking of the Big 5 were revealed to the public, with Paul Jake taking the first rank, followed by Jason, Melisa, Johan and Tibo, respectively.

S–E voting system result
Below is the eviction voting result from the eighth to fourteenth eviction round. This voting system was stopped after the fourteenth eviction round.

Fake eviction voting history
While the fate of housemates inside the House continues to rely on public votes, the voting history table below shows how the housemates voted against each other due to the Char-Char Change twist. On Day 120, Big Brother announced that the voting were all voided, and viewers still had power to vote ending the twist

 Nominated Housemates
 Head of Household

Big Date on the Big Night
The finale of the season, dubbed Big Date on the Big Night, was held at the Ninoy Aquino Stadium in Manila. As the finale was held a day before Valentine's Day, the show was partly given a Valentine/prom night theme. References to the Chinese zodiac and anything Chinese also abounded as the show was also held on the eve of Chinese New Year.

The opening song which references the Big 5 were sung by Bugoy Drilon, Jay-R Siaboc, Mark Bautista, Rocksteddy's Teddy Corpuz, Yeng Constantino and Charice Pempengco. The 21 ex-housemates also performed dances done throughout the season, namely Drinking Boys, 'Di Makatulog (the Filipino version of Insomnia), the Indian tiger dance, and even Can't Take My Eyes Off You. Accompanying the housemates were Sheryn Regis, Harish Singh, and Charlie Green in each of the last three mentioned.

To drum up support for each of the finalists, color-coded cheerleaders and live satellite feeds from Cebu, General Santos, Cagayan de Oro, and Mindoro were also seen.

The finale also announced the coming of the third Teen Edition, Pinoy Big Brother: Teen Clash 2010, as well as the appearances of the cast of Rubi, the Jabawockeez, and Kim Chiu.

The season was won by Melisa, who amassed 1,226,675 votes or 32.08% of the entire vote since it began since Day 120. Leaving before her were Paul Jake (1,044,275 votes or 27.31%), Jason (954,961 votes or 24.97%), Johan (303,751 votes or 7.94%), and Tibo (294,262 votes or 7.69%), who left the House as the so-called 5th Big Placer.

This table shows the summary of votes as obtained by each of the Big 5 in the Big Night.

The Big Reunion
On February 14, 2010, a day after the Big Night, the ex-housemates - minus Princess, Tom and Rocky - returned to the Big Brother House one more time to reflect on the season. The evictees were interviewed by Bianca in House B while Toni and the Big Five gathered in House A. Mariel handled things from the Confession Room. Cathy and Hermes received a call from Big Brother Finland winner Aso and second-placer Katlin. Toni admitted to the Big Five that the interviews for the Big Swap were fake. They were greeted by Big Utol and visited by Vilma Santos, who advised them about the challenges of a showbiz career. Big Brother delivered his farewell address to the Housemates.

References

External links
Official website

Pinoy Big Brother seasons
2009 Philippine television seasons
2010 Philippine television seasons